Adventure World is a theme park in Bibra Lake, Western Australia. The park opened on 11 November 1982 as "Adventureworld at Bibra Lakes" and undergoes a winter closure each year.

Adventure World was built on an old limestone quarry at Bibra Lake.  of sand were used to reshape the land for the initial landscape of the park before it opened on 11 November 1982.

The theme park has 25 different attractions, including the "Goliath" launched in 2017, the $12 million roller coaster “Abyss” launched in 2013, the $7 million dollar Kraken, which is the longest, tallest and steepest Funnel water slide of its kind, the "Dragon’s Kingdom" children area and Hawaiian themed water playground "Kahuna Falls". Adventure World is a seasonal business open for 7 months a year to take advantage of Western Australia's summer climate.

Attractions

The following is a list of the rides and attractions at Adventure World.

Current 

 Dragon's Kingdom - A medieval children's section of the park. The section contains:
 Kingdom Falls, a water play attraction
 The Little Leaper, a Zamperla hopper
 The Barnacle, a Zamperla Rockin Tug
Dragon Express, a steel roller coaster for kids
 Dragon Flyer, a Zamperla fixed arm rotating ride
 Yarli's Barrel Spin
 Yarli's Safari
Aussie Wildlife Experience, a zoo attraction that contains a range of Australian animals
 Tidal Wave - a racing mat water slide
 Rail Rider - a single rail pedal attraction
 Grand Prix Raceway - a set of go karts
 Buccaneer Battle - a set of bumper boats
 Kahuna Falls - The largest water playground of its kind in Australia
 Rocky Rapids - a tube slide
 Mat Slides - a series of water slides where guests ride on mats
 Sky Lift - a chairlift (currently n/a)
 Sea Serpents - a pair of dueling raft waterslides made by Australian Waterslides and Leisure
 Tunnel of Terror - a tandem tube slide
 Wahoo Speed Slides - a body slide
 The Lagoon - a large swimming pool
 Inferno - a HUSS Rides SHOT'N DROP ride built on the old Turbo Mountain site
 The Black Widow - a Zamperla Power Surge
 The Rampage - a Moser Maverick 32
Abyss - a $12 million Gerstlauer Euro-Fighter roller coaster which is the single largest investment in the park's history
 The Kraken - a $7 million Proslide Tornado 60 Waterslide (The world's longest and steepest Tornado waterslide)
 Goliath - a $7.5 million Intamin Gyro-Swing

Previous
 Bounty's Revenge - a swinging pirate ship
 Paddle Boats - a set of paddle boats
 Whistle Stop Train - a train
 Turbo Mountain - an Anton Schwarzkopf Jet Star II bought second hand from Luna Park Sydney. Closed in 2009 to make room for the Freefall.
 The Luge a downhill sled on a concrete track.
 The Haunted Castle, selection of wax work figures on display

Future
Adventure World announces a new major attraction typically every two seasons, but this is not guaranteed nor a policy, it's more of a coincidence, or loose goal to aim for. More recently new rides are codenamed "MI" (Major Impact) followed by a number (in sequential order). There is currently a new ride scheduled for summer 2022 in dragon kingdom for the 22/23 Season, currently the Yarlis Dragon Chase ride type is unknown and the manufacturer is Zamperla.

Food and beverage outlets
Adventure World has many food outlets. These are:
 Dragon's Bites (presently N/A)
 Scream 'n' Eats
 Sweet Treats
 Surf Shack
 Kahuna Cafe
 Full of Beans
 Tiki Bar

References

External links

 
 Wikimedia Page https://commons.wikimedia.org/wiki/Category:Adventure_World_(amusement_park)

Amusement parks in Western Australia
1982 establishments in Australia
Amusement parks opened in 1982